Cobbitty is a semi-rural town of the Macarthur Region near the town of Camden, southwest of Sydney, in the state of New South Wales, Australia. The area is mostly farmland with a population of around 2000.

Overview
The area is mostly farmland and agricultural. At the southern end of the suburb, bordering the Nepean River is Camden Airport, a site for gliding and skydiving. The main road, Cobbitty Road, is home to "Cobbitty Primary School", a general store, a small cafe, and "Teen Ranch". Teen Ranch is a Christian organisation that runs school and holiday programs for teens.

Cobbitty is home to a New South Wales Rural Fire Service brigade. The Brigade has two trucks and is often called upon for incidents both within and outside of the district. The brigade has currently 40 members, and is active throughout the year, not just during bushfire season.

The area has views over the township of Camden. Macarthur Anglican School is in Cobbitty.

History
The area now known as Cobbitty was originally home to the Muringong, southernmost of the Darug people. Settlement began in the early 19th century following the establishment of John Macarthur's Camden Park Estate nearby.

Cobbitty Post Office opened on 1 May 1869 and closed in 1993.

Heritage listings 
Cobbitty has a number of heritage-listed sites, including:
 421 The Northern Road: Denbigh, Cobbitty

Demographics
At the 2016 census, Cobbitty had a population of 2,063 people. A large proportion (79.0%) of these people were born in Australia, with other common countries of birth being England (4.9%), New Zealand (1.2%), Netherlands (0.9%), Germany (0.7%) and Italy (0.5%). 86.1% of people only spoke English at home. The most common responses for religion in Cobbitty were Catholic (36.8%), Anglican (26.0%) and no religion (14.6%). The major industries of employment for people aged 15 years and over in Cobbitty included primary education (3.4%), house construction (2.9%), road freight transport (2.4%), secondary education (2.3%) and hospitals (except psychiatric hospitals) (2.2%).

Politics
Cobbitty is part of the north ward of Camden Council represented by Lara Symkowiak, who is also the local mayor. The suburb is in the federal electorate of Hume, represented by Angus Taylor (Liberal), and the state electorate of Camden, held by Peter Sidgreaves, also of the Liberal Party.

References

External links
  [CC-By-SA]

 
Suburbs of Sydney